Ludwig Teller (June 22, 1911 – October 4, 1965) was an American lawyer, politician, and World War II veteran from New York. From 1957 to 1961, he served two terms in the U.S. House of Representatives.

Life
Teller was born on June 22, 1911, in Manhattan. He graduated from New York University in 1936. He served as a Lieutenant in the United States Navy during World War II. He served on the faculty of New York University Law School from 1947 until 1950.

Political career 
He was a member of the New York State Assembly (New York Co., 5th D.) from 1951 to 1956, sitting in the 168th through 170th New York State Legislatures.

Congress 
He was elected as a Democrat to the 85th and 86th United States Congresses, holding office from January 3, 1957 to January 3, 1961. He was defeated for renomination in the Democratic primary of 1960 by Reform Democrat William Fitts Ryan.

Death and burial 
Teller died on October 4, 1965 and was buried at the Union Field Cemetery in Ridgewood, Queens.

See also
 List of Jewish members of the United States Congress

Sources

United States Navy officers
Jewish American military personnel
United States Navy personnel of World War II
New York University alumni
Democratic Party members of the New York State Assembly
Jewish members of the United States House of Representatives
People from Manhattan
1911 births
1965 deaths
Democratic Party members of the United States House of Representatives from New York (state)
20th-century American politicians
20th-century American Jews